Carleton-York is a provincial electoral district for the Legislative Assembly of New Brunswick, Canada.  It was contested for the first time in the 2014 general election. It was created in the 2013 redistribution of electoral boundaries.

The district draws its population from the northwestern parts of York County and southern parts of Carleton County, the boundaries commission proposed it be named "York" which might have been confused with its immediate predecessor of the same name which was based in southwestern York County.  The two districts share only about 12% of population in common.  Accordingly, a committee of the legislative assembly changed the name to Carleton-York before the district could be contested.

The new district includes all of Carleton County south of the Town of Woodstock, and northwestern parts of York County including Nackawic, Meductic, Canterbury and Harvey.

Members of the Legislative Assembly

Election results

References

External links 
Website of the Legislative Assembly of New Brunswick
Map of riding as of 2018

New Brunswick provincial electoral districts